Avondhu GAA is a Gaelic football and Hurling division in the north of Cork, Ireland. The division includes teams such as Charleville, Mallow, Fermoy, and Mitchelstown. It is one of eight divisions of Cork County Board. It organizes competitions for the clubs within the division, from Under 12 up to the adult level. The winners of these competitions compete against other divisional champions to determine which club is the county champion. In addition, the division selects football and hurling teams from the adult teams playing at junior level or county intermediate level, and these then compete for the Cork GAA Senior Football Championship and Cork Senior Hurling Championship.

Achievements
 Cork Senior Hurling Championship
 Winners (3): 1952, 1966, 1996
Runners-Up (1): 1961
 Cork Senior Football Championship
Winners (1): 1961
Runners-Up (2): 1958, 1960

Clubs
 Araglen
 Ballyhooly
 Ballyclough
 Ballygiblin
 Ballyhea
 Buttevant
 Castletownroche
 Charleville
 Churchtown
 Clyda Rovers
 Dromina
 Doneraile
 Fermoy
 Glanworth
 Grange
 Kildorrery
 Killavullen
 Kilshannig
 Kilworth
 Liscarroll
 Liscarroll Churchtown Gaels
 Mallow
 Milford
 Mitchelstown
 Newtownshandrum
 Shanballymore

Hurling Clubs

Football Clubs

Hurling

Competitions 
 North Cork Junior A Hurling Championship
 North Cork Junior B Hurling Championship 
 North Cork U21 Hurling Championship

Grades

Football

Competitions 
 North Cork Junior A Football Championship
 North Cork Junior B Football Championship
 North Cork U21 Football Championship

Grades

Notable players
 Pat Mulcahy
 Neil Ronan
 Fergal McCormack
 Ray Carey
 Paudie Kissane

References
 Avondhu GAA website

Divisional boards of Cork GAA
Gaelic games clubs in County Cork
Gaelic football clubs in County Cork
Hurling clubs in County Cork